Vertige may refer to:

Vertigo, a 1917 French film,
Vertige (1969 film), a 1969 Canadian documentary film,
High Lane, a 2009 French drama film,
Vertige (TV series), a 2012 Canadian drama television miniseries,
Vertige Graphic, a French publisher of comic books and graphic novels.